Marian Pankowski (9 November 1919 – 3 April 2011) was a Polish writer, poet, literary critic and translator.

Pankowski was born in Sanok. He was a member of the Polish resistance during World War II, and a prisoner in the Nazi concentration camp Bergen-Belsen. After the war, he settled in Belgium, where he died in Brussels from pneumonia on 3 April 2011 at the age of 91.

Writing 
Pankowski's Holocaust narratives critically engage with the Polish tradition; he frequently criticizes the pronounced patriarchalism cum Catholicism. The controversy that resulted from his writing seems to stem from his "unconventional approach to sexuality, including same-sex love."

Besides writing original work, Pankowski has published translations of Polish poetry into French.

References

External links
marianpankowski.pl, website about Marian Pankowski 
International conference on Marian Pankowski's work, 13–14 November 2009, Brussels
 Russian Literature, Volume 70, 15 November 2011, Issue 4, pages 467-644, is devoted entirely to Pankowski.

1919 births
2011 deaths
People from Sanok
Polish resistance members of World War II
Polish male writers
People associated with the magazine "Kultura"